Images is the tenth studio album by American country music singer Ronnie Milsap, released in 1979 by RCA Records. The first single to be released from the album was "Nobody Likes Sad Songs". It would become Ronnie Milsap's twelfth number one on the country chart. "In No Time at All" was released in August 1979 as the second single from the album. The song reached number 6 on the Billboard Hot Country Singles chart. The flip side track from the 45 rpm, "Get It Up", a disco style track also charted independently on the pop charts.

Track listing

Production
Produced By Ronnie Milsap, Tom Collins
Engineers: Benny Harris, Travis Turk

Personnel
Drums: Hayward Bishop, Roger Clark, Larrie Londin, Kenny Malone
Percussion: Charlie McCoy, Farrell Morris
Vibraphone: Charlie McCoy
Bass guitar: Warren Gowers, Mike Leech, Joe Osborn
Keyboards: David Briggs, Clayton Ivey, Ronnie Milsap, Bobby Ogdin, Hargus "Pig" Robbins, Bobby Wood
Acoustic Guitar: Jimmy Capps
Electric Guitar: Pete Bordonali, Robert Byrne, Bruce Dees, Reggie Young
Steel Guitar: Lloyd Green
Harmonica: Charlie McCoy
Strings: The Sheldon Kurland Strings; arranged by D. Bergen White
Harp: Cindy Reynolds
Lead Vocals: Ronnie Milsap
Background Vocals: The Lea Jane Singers

References

1979 albums
Ronnie Milsap albums
RCA Records albums
Albums produced by Tom Collins (record producer)